Gurjar or Gujjar (also transliterated as Gujar, Gurjara and Gujjer) is an ethnic nomadic, agricultural and pastoral community, residing mainly in India, Pakistan and Afghanistan, divided internally into various clan groups. They were traditionally involved in agriculture and pastoral and nomadic activities and formed a large homogeneous group. The historical role of Gurjars has been quite diverse in society: at one end they have been founders of several kingdoms and dynasties and, at the other end, some are still nomads with no land of their own.

The pivotal point in the history of Gurjar identity is often traced back to the emergence of a Gurjara kingdom in present-day Rajasthan during the Middle Ages (around 570 CE). It is believed that the Gurjars migrated to different parts of the Indian Subcontinent from the Gurjaratra. 

The Gurjaras started fading from the forefront of history after the 10th century CE. Thereafter, history records several Gurjar chieftains and upstart warriors, who were rather petty rulers in contrast to their predecessors. "Gujar" and "Gujjar" were quite common during the Mughal era, and documents dating from the period mention Gujars as a "turbulent" people. 

The Indian states of Gujarat and Rajasthan were known as Gurjaradesa and Gurjaratra for centuries prior to the arrival of the British. The Gujrat and Gujranwala districts of Pakistani Punjab have also been associated with Gurjars from as early as the 8th century CE, when there existed a Gurjara kingdom in the same area. The Saharanpur district of Uttar Pradesh was also known as Gurjargadh previously, due to the presence of many Gurjar zamindars in the area.

Gurjars are linguistically and religiously diverse. Although they are able to speak the language of the region and country where they live, Gurjars have their own language, known as Gujari. They variously follow Hinduism, Islam, and Sikhism. 

The Hindu Gurjars are mostly found in Indian states of Rajasthan, Haryana, Madhya Pradesh, Punjab Plains and Maharashtra. Muslim Gurjars are mostly found in Punjab, Pakistann, mainly concentrated in Northern Punjabi cities of Gujranwala, Gujrat, Gujar Khan, Jehlum and Lahore, Afghanistan and Indian Himalayan regions such as Jammu & Kashmir, Himachal Pradesh, and Garhwal and Kumaon divisions of Uttarakhand.

Etymology 
The word Gujjar represents a  caste and a tribe and a group in India, Pakistan, and Afghanistan, locally referred to as jati, zaat, qaum or biradari The history of the word Gurjar can be confidently traced back to an ancient ethnic and tribal identity called Gurjara, which became prominent after the collapse of the Gupta Empire. A literal or definitive meaning of the word Gurjara is not available in any of the historical references. 

It has been suggested by several historians that Gurjara was initially the name of a tribe or clan which later evolved into a geographical and ethnic identity following the establishment of a janapada (tribal kingdom) called 'Gurjara'. This understanding has introduced an element of ambiguity regarding ancient royal designations containing the word 'gurjara' such as gurjaraeshvara or gurjararaja, as now it is debatable whether the kings bearing these epithets were tribal or ethnic Gurjaras.

History

Origin 
Historians and anthropologists differ on the issue of Gurjar origin. According to one view, circa 1 CE, the ancient ancestors of the Gurjars came in multiple waves of migration and were initially accorded status as high-caste warriors in the Hindu fold in the North-Western regions (modern Rajasthan and Gujarat). Aydogdy Kurbanov states that some Gurjars, along with people from northwestern India, merged with the Hephthalites to become the Rajput clan.

Previously, it was believed that the Gurjars had migrated earlier on from Central Asia as well, however, this view is generally considered to be speculative. According to B.D. Chattopadhyaya, historical references speak of Gurjara warriors and commoners in North India in the 7th century CE, and mention several Gurjara kingdoms and dynasties. 

However, according to Tanuja Kothiyal, the historical image of Gurjars is that of 'ignorant' herders, though historical claims of Gurjar past also associate them with Gurjara-Pratiharas. She cites a myth that any Rajput claim Gurjars may have comes through a Rajput marrying a Brahmin woman, and not through older Kshatriya clan. However, she states that the historical process suggests the opposite: that Rajputs emerged from other communities, such as Gurjars, Jats, Raikas etc.

The oldest reference to the word Gurjara is found in the book called Harshacharita (Harsha's Deeds), a biography of king Harshavardhana written around 630 CE. Banabhatta, the author of Harshacharita, mentions that Harsha's father Prabhakravardhana (560-580 CE) was "a constant threat to the sleep of Gurjara"—apparently a reference to the Gurjara king or kingdom. Inscriptions from a collateral branch of Gurjaras, known as Gurjaras of Lata, claim that their family was ruling Bharakucha (Bharuch) as early as 450 CE from their capital at Nandipuri. Based on these early dates, it has been proposed by some authors that Gurjara identity might have been present in India as early as the 3rd century CE, but it became prominent only after the fall of Guptas.

According to scholars such as Baij Nath Puri, the Mount Abu (ancient Arbuda Mountain) region of present-day Rajasthan had been an abode of the Gurjars during the medieval period. The association of the Gurjars with the mountain is noticed in many inscriptions and epigraphs including Tilakamanjari of Dhanpala. These Gurjars migrated from the Arbuda mountain region and as early as in the 6th century A.D., they set up one or more principalities in Rajasthan and Gujarat. The whole or a larger part of Rajasthan and Gujarat had been long known as Gurjaratra (country ruled or protected by the Gurjars) or Gurjarabhumi (land of the Gurjars) for centuries prior to the Mughal period.

In Sanskrit texts, the ethnonym has sometimes been interpreted as "destroyer of the enemy": gur meaning "enemy" and ujjar meaning "destroyer").

In its survey of The People of India, the Anthropological Survey of India (AnSI) – a government-sponsored organisation – noted that 

Irawati Karve, an indologist and historian, believed that the Gurjars' position in society and the caste system generally varied from one linguistic area of India to another. In Maharashtra, Karve thought that they were probably absorbed by the Rajputs and Marathas but retained some of their distinct identity. She based her theories on analysis of clan names and tradition, noting that while most Rajputs claim their origins to lie in the mythological Chandravansh or Suryavansh dynasties, at least two of the communities in the region claimed instead to be descended from the Agnivansh.

Medieval period 
Babur, in the context of revolt, wrote that Jats and Gujjars poured down from hills in vast numbers in order to carry off oxen and buffaloes and that they were guilty of the severest oppression in the country.
Many Gurjars were converted to Islam at various times, dating back to Mahmud of Ghazni's raid in Gujarat in 1026. Gurjars of Awadh and Meerut date their conversion to Tamerlane, when he sacked Delhi and forcibly converted them. By 1525, when Babur invaded India, he saw that the Gurjars of northern Punjab were already Muslims. Until the 1700s, conversions continued under Aurangzeb, who converted the Gurjars of Himachal Pradesh by force. Pathans and Balochis drove Gurjar converts out of their land, forcing them into vagrancy.

British rule 

In the 18th century, several Gurjar chieftains and small kings were in power. During the reign of Rohilla Nawab Najib-ul-Daula, Rao Dargahi Singh Bhati, the Gurjar chieftain of Dadri possessed 133 villages at a fixed revenue of Rs. 29,000. A fort in Parikshitgarh in Meerut district, also known as Qila Parikishatgarh, is ascribed to a Gujar king Nain Singh Nagar. Morena, Samthar, Dholpur, Saharanpur and Roorkee were also some of the places ruled by Gurjar Kings.

In Delhi, the Metcalfe House was sacked by Gurjar villagers from whom the land had been taken to erect the building. The British records claim that the Gurjars carried out several robberies. Twenty Gurjars were reported to have been beheaded by Rao Tula Ram for committing dacoities in July 1857. In September 1857, the British were able to enlist the support of many Gurjars at Meerut. A British administrator, William Crooke, stated that Gurjars seriously impeded the operations of British forces before they captured Delhi. 

The colonial authors always used the code word "turbulent" for the castes who were generally hostile to British rule. They cited proverbs that appear to evaluate the caste in an unfavorable light. Reporter Meena Radhakrishna believes that the colonial authorities classified the Gurjars along with others as "criminal tribes" because of their active participation in the revolt of 1857 and also because they considered these tribes to be prone to criminality in the absence of legitimate means of livelihood.

Culture

Afghanistan 

The Gujar people are a tribal group who have lived in Afghanistan for centuries. According to the Afghanistan news agency Pajwok Afghan News, there are currently an estimated 1.5 million Gujar people residing in the country.  

The Gujar people are predominantly found in the northeastern regions of Afghanistan, including Kapisa, Baghlan, Balkh, Kunduz, Takhar, Badakhshan, Nuristan, Laghman, Nangarhar, and Khost. They have a distinct culture and way of life.  

There are an estimated 3,000 families living in the Baghlan-e-Markazi district. The Gujar in Afghanistan are also found in small pockets of Afghanistan's northeastern region, particularly in and around the Nuristan province. 

The Afghanistan constitution recognises 14 ethnic groups officially with the Gujar ethnic group being one of them.   

Many Gujar tribal people in Afghanistan are deprived of their rights and their living conditions are poor. The Gujar in Afghanistan have sometimes been internally displaced in the past by illegal militias, during 2018 around 200 Gujar families were displaced from their homes in Farkhar district in Takhar province.  

During the corona virus pandemic, the Gujar people in the northeastern province of Badakhshan used Andak meat to treat the corona virus, due to lack of clinics and other health facilities in their areas. The  Gujar Tribe Council deemed the meat of the Andak animal as Haram, however many Gujar people in the area said they had no choice. 

In the past Gujar tribal leaders have met with the  previous president of Afghanistan, Hamid Karzai. The Gujar elders demanded schools and hospitals to be built in their areas and the Afghan government give scholarships to Gujar students to study abroad.

India 
In India Gurjars are one of the prominent castes besides Jats and Rajputs.

Today, the Gurjars are classified under the Other Backward Class category in some states in India. However, in Jammu and Kashmir and parts of Himachal Pradesh, they are designated as a Scheduled Tribe under the Indian government's reservation program of positive discrimination. Hindu Gurjars were assimilated into several varnas.

Delhi
Gurjars form an important component of Delhi. They have combined their traditional occupation of pastoralism and marginal cultivation over a large area in and around Delhi. Currently there is one Gurjar Member of Parliament, Ramesh Bidhuri, and six Gurjar MLAs, including the Leader of the Opposition in the Delhi Legislative Assembly, Ramvir Singh Bidhuri, Madan Lal, Sahi Ram, Kartar Singh Tanwar, Dhanwanti Chandila and 26 Councillors in the MCD. A part of National Highway 24 was named after Gurjar Samrat Mihir Bhoja Marg by then Chief Minister Sahib Singh Verma.

Haryana 

The Gurjar community in Haryana has set elaborate guidelines for solemnizing marriages and holding other functions. In a mahapanchayat ("the great panchayat"), the Gujjar community decided that those who sought dowry would be excommunicated from the society.

Rajasthan 

The Rajasthani Gurjars worship Surya, Devnarayan (an avatar of Vishnu), Shiva and Bhavani.

In Rajasthan, some members of the Gurjar community resorted to violent protests over the issue of reservation in 2006 and 2007. During the 2003 election to the Rajasthan assembly, the Bharatiya Janata Party (BJP) promised them Scheduled Tribe status. However, the party failed to keep its promise after coming to the power, resulting in protests by the Gurjars in September 2006.

In May 2007, during violent protests over the reservation issue, members of the Gurjar community clashed with the police. Subsequently, the Gurjar protested violently, under various groups including the Gurjar Sangarsh Samiti, Gurjar Mahasabha and the Gurjar Action Committee. The protestors blocked roads and set fire to two police stations and some vehicles. Presently, the Gurjars in Rajasthan are classified as Other Backward Classes.

On 5 June 2007, Gurjars rioted over their desire to be added to the central list of tribes who are given preference in India government job selection as well as placement in the schools sponsored by the states of India. This preference is given under a system designed to help India's poor and disadvantaged citizens. However, other tribes on the list oppose this request, as it would make it harder to obtain the few positions already set aside.

In December 2007, the Akhil Bhartiya Gurjar Mahasabha ("All-India Gurjar Council") stated that the community would boycott BJP, which was in power in Rajasthan. But in 2009 the Gurjar community was supporting BJP so that they could be politically benefitted. Kirori Singh Bainsla fought and lost on the BJP ticket. In early 2000s (decade), the Gurjar community in Dang region of Rajasthan was also in news for the falling sex ratio, unavailability of brides, and the resulting polyandry.

Madhya Pradesh 

, the Gurjars in Madhya Pradesh are classified as Other Backward Classes.

Maharashtra 
In Maharashtra, Gurjars are in very good numbers in Jalgaon District. Dode Gurjars and Dore Gurjars are listed as Other Backward Classes in Maharashtra.

Gujarat 
The State took its name from the Gurjara, the land of the Gurjars, who ruled the area during the 700s and 800s. 

They are listed among the Other Backward Classes of Gujarat.

The Kutch Gurjar Kshatriya (also known as Mistri) and Gurjar Kshatriya Kadia are minority communities of Gujarat which are listed among the Other Backward Classes of Gujarat.

A few scholars believe that the Leva Kunbis (or Kambis) of Gujarat, a section of the Patidars, are possibly of Gurjar origin. However, several others state that the Patidars are Kurmis or Kunbis (Kanbis); Gurjars are included in the OBC list in Gujarat but Patidars are not.

The Gurjars are a subtype of Kumhar and Prajapati community of Gujarat and are listed among the Other Backward Classes of Gujarat.

Gurjars of North Gujarat, along with those of Western Rajasthan and Punjab, worship Sitala and Bhavani.

Himachal Pradesh 
, the Gurjars in parts of Himachal Pradesh were classified as a Scheduled Tribe. They are mostly found in the Chamba district of the state and are predominantly Muslim. They are closely related to the Gurjars and Bakarwals of neighbouring Jammu and Kashmir.

Jammu and Kashmir 

 
The Gurjars and Bakerwals tribes of Jammu and Kashmir were declared a Scheduled Tribe (ST) in 1991. In the Indian Union Territory of Jammu and Kashmir, the concentration of Gurjars is observed in all but largely found in Rajouri, Poonch, Reasi, Kishtwar district and, followed by, Anantnag, Udhampur and Doda districts. It is believed that Gurjars migrated to Jammu and Kashmir from Gujarat (via Rajasthan) and Hazara district of Khyber Pakhtunkhwa.

, the Gurjars and the Bakarwals in Jammu and Kashmir were classified as Scheduled Tribes constitute 12% of the total population of Jammu and Kashmir. However, they claim that they constitute more than 20% of the population, and allege undercounting because of their nomadic lifestyle, saying that when the censuses were held in 2001 and 2011, half of their population had been in the upper reaches of the Himalaya. According to the 2011 Census of India, Gurjars are the most populous scheduled tribe in Jammu and Kashmir, having a population of nearly 1.5 million. Nearly all of them follow Islam.

The Gurjars of Jammu and Kashmir in 2007 demanded that this tribal community be treated as a linguistic minority in the erstwhile state and provided with constitutional safeguards for their language Gojri. They also pressured the state government to urge the central government to include Gojri in the list of official languages of India.

In 2002, some Gurjars and Bakarwals in Jammu and Kashmir demanded a separate state called Gujaristan for Gujjar and Bakarwal communities, under the banner of All India Gurjar Parishad. Gurjars and Bakarwals have at times been targeted by militants of the insurgency in the territory, such as during the Kot Charwal and Teli Katha massacres.

Uttarakhand 

The Van Gujjars ("forest Gurjars") are found in the Shivalik Hills area of Uttarakhand. The Van Gujjars follow Islam, and they have their own clans, similar to the Hindu gotras. They are a pastoral semi-nomadic community, practising transhumance. In the winter season, the Van Gujjars migrate with herds of semi-wild water buffalo to the Shivalik Hills at the foot of the Himalayas, and in summer, they migrate to alpine pastures higher up the Himalayas. The Gurjars sell milk to local peoples as their primary source of income. They treat their animals with great care and do not eat them nor sell them for meat.

The Van Gujjars have had conflicts with forest authorities, who prohibited human and livestock populations inside reserved parks. However, India's Forest Rights Act of 2006 granted rights to "traditional forest dwellers" to the lands they have relied on for generations. The conflict between local forest officials, who claim rights over the newly created parks, and the thousand year nomadic traditions of the Van Gujjars has been ongoing.

Pakistan 
Several cities in Punjab, Pakistan are named after the Gurjars, including Gujranwala (district headquarters), Gujrat (district headquarters), Gujar Khan, (tehsil headquarters), and Gojra (tehsil headquarters) . Due to migrations, large Gujjar population can also be found in Islamabad, Sialkot, Lahore and Faisalabad. The majority of Gurjars in Pakistan speak Punjabi. Punjabi, Kashmiri and Khyber Pakhtunkhwa Gurjars typically use the prefixes Chaudhry, Malik, Rana, Khan, Nawab, Mehar, Rajput, Sardar and Nawabzada, as courtesy titles.

See also 
 Gurjaradesa
 Gurjaras of Lata
 Gurjaras of Mandavyapura
 Gurjara-Pratihara
 Bhadanakas
 List of Gurjar clans
 Notable Gurjar Personalities

References 
Notes

Citations

Bibliography

Further reading

External links 

Report of NDTV on Baisoya Gurjars of Kalka Garhi (a village in central Delhi) and their traditions including their ruling monarchs

 
Ethnic groups in India
Ethnic groups in Afghanistan
Social groups of Pakistan
Social groups of Rajasthan
Social groups of Gujarat
Social groups of Jammu and Kashmir
Social groups of Khyber Pakhtunkhwa
Social groups of Uttar Pradesh
Social groups of Madhya Pradesh
Social groups of Maharashtra
Social groups of Haryana
Social groups of Punjab, Pakistan
Social groups of Punjab, India
Social groups of Himachal Pradesh
Ethnic groups in Kunar Province
Hindu dynasties
Punjabi tribes
Hindkowan tribes
Demographic history of India
Pastoralists
Scheduled Tribes of Jammu and Kashmir
Scheduled Tribes of Himachal Pradesh
Indian castes